The following highways are numbered 491:

Canada
Manitoba Provincial Road 491

Israel
Route 491 (Israel)

Japan
 Japan National Route 491

United States
  Interstate 491 (cancelled proposal)
  U.S. Route 491
  Delaware Route 491
  Florida State Road 491 (former)
  Maryland Route 491
  Pennsylvania Route 491
  Puerto Rico Highway 491